Yevgeni Vladimirovich Fedotov (born 31 December 1976) is a Russian professional football coach and a former player.

Fedotov played in the Russian Football National League with FC Lokomotiv Chita.

Honours
 Russian Second Division, Zone East best midfielder: 2010.

External links
 

1976 births
Living people
Russian footballers
Russian football managers
Association football midfielders
FC Smena Komsomolsk-na-Amure players
FC Chita players